The Association of British Orchestras (ABO) exists to support, promote and advance the interests and activities of professional orchestras in the United Kingdom. The organisation was founded in 1947 as the Orchestral Employers' Association, primarily to negotiate with the Musicians' Union (UK) and other bodies on behalf of its membership, which consisted almost entirely at that time of those orchestras receiving annual funding from the newly established Arts Council of Great Britain. The past decade has seen a substantial development in the organisation in terms of its size (an increase from 35 organisations in 1989 to over 180 today) and its role has expanded to include a diverse range of activities designed to support the development of the UK's orchestral life.

Mission
The ABO's mission is to enable and support a vibrant, innovative, collaborative and sustainable orchestral sector. It exists to support and champion professional orchestras in the UK in their ambition to perform music to the highest artistic standards for the widest possible audience.

The key objectives of the Association cover three areas of activity:

•	Connecting
•	Championing
•	Developing

History
The Association of British Orchestras was founded in 1947 as the Orchestral Employers' Association, primarily to negotiate with the Musicians' Union (UK) and other bodies on behalf of its membership, which consisted almost entirely at that time of those orchestras receiving annual funding from the newly established Arts Council of Great Britain. In 1982 the Association took on limited company status, becoming the Association of British Orchestras.  It continues to negotiate the ABO/MU Freelance Orchestral Agreement with the MU and represent its membership in discussions and negotiations with a number of other national organisations.

The Association of British Orchestras has developed a role as co-ordinator of various national projects, including two major sponsorship programmes involving the participation of a large number of member orchestras. A series of nationally co-ordinated education projects over the past years resulted in the Orchestras in Education programme, which existed to promote the education work of member orchestras and to develop the relationship between schools, teachers, and orchestral players.

The ABO has also mounted a number of research initiatives, with a series of industry reports being produced, such as a comprehensive statistical survey of the UK's orchestral profession, 'Knowing the Score', and a report on noise damage to musicians, 'A Sound Ear'.

Healthy Orchestra Charter
The Healthy Orchestra Charter is a joint initiative by the ABO and the Musicians' Benevolent Fund. Launched at the 2006 ABO Conference in Newcastle/Gateshead, the Charter aims to set an industry-wise standard of care and award charter marks to orchestras that are displaying good practice towards the physical, mental and emotional health of employees – both orchestral musicians and their management.

Pearle
The ABO and its members are members of PEARLE*, which helps the ABO keep track of legislative developments within the EU.

Sustainable touring
The ABO is working with Julie's Bicycle, a not-for-profit organisation helping the music industry cut its greenhouse gas emissions and create a low carbon creative future and has published the Green Orchestras Guide and Green Charter.

Annual Conference

The ABO's primary event each year is its annual conference, the major gathering of the classical music industry in the UK, with around 300 delegates drawn from orchestras both from within the UK and abroad, plus funding agencies, venues, agents, publishers, and suppliers. The principal media partner is Classic FM.

ABO Trust
The ABO Trust is the charitable wing of the Association of British Orchestras and exists to support its work. Its remit includes the promotion of public musical education, research projects, research archive, and fundraising.

Members

Full members

Full membership of ABO is open to professional orchestras and ensembles which have existed for not less than two years in the UK, and have undertaken no fewer than 24 public performances.  Subscription levels are based on the turnover of each orchestra.

Associate members
Associate members include those who have not yet fulfilled the requirements of full membership, as well as conservatoires, music colleges, youth orchestras and overseas orchestras.

Affiliate members
Affiliate membership is for those organisations involved with the presentation, support and commissioning of the work of the Association's members

Corporate members
Corporate membership is available to organisations with related interests to the orchestral sector and who share the ABO's aims and objectives, who wish to be kept up-to-date on current affairs and topics of mutual interest.  These include concert halls, agents, promoters, composers, and organisations.  Membership is also open to businesses and sponsors.

Sources
 Association of British Orchestras www.abo.org.uk, 23 March 2010
 Arts Council England www.arts Council, 23 March 2010
 Classic FM 'Association of British Orchestras' www.classicfm.co.uk, 18 March 2010
 Department for Culture, Media and Sport www.culture.gov.uk 22 March 2010
 International Artists Managers' Association www.iama.com 22 March 2010
 Musicians Union Website www.musiciansunion.org.uk 1 April 2010
 Scottish Arts Council www.scottisharts.org.uk 1 April 2010

References

British orchestras
1947 establishments in the United Kingdom
Arts organizations established in 1947